Inishmacowney (Gaeilge: Inis Mhic Uaithne), also known as Horse Island, is an uninhabited island and townland in the River Fergus and Kildysart parish in County Clare, Ireland. The island has an area of 0.9698 km2 (239 acres) and consists of mainly grassland. The island has been uninhabited since 1976, but boasted a population of 44 in 1911.

References

Islands of County Clare
Uninhabited islands of Ireland
River islands of Ireland